The American Center for Art and Culture, formally known as the Mona Bismarck American Center and open from 1986 to 2022, was a venue based in Paris, France that was dedicated to the presentation of American creation and culture.

The center was launched in 2011, based on the legacy of the Mona Bismarck Foundation, which became active in 1986 following the death of its founder and sole benefactor. The American philanthropist Countess Mona von Bismarck donated her Parisian townhouse and the majority of her estate to found the Mona Bismarck Foundation, as "her desire was to establish a Cultural Centre in Paris to enhance the cause of American/French friendship upon her death".

On 4 July 2019, the Mona Bismarck American Center became the American Center for Art and Culture. On 12 December 2020 it was announced that the center sold the property to the American Library in Paris.

History

The Center 
Located on the Seine, across from the Eiffel Tower, the hôtel particulier, or Parisian townhouse, was built at the end of the 19th century. It was reconfigured for Mona Bismarck in the late 1950s by French interior decorator Stéphane Boudin. The building was featured in a 1928 issue of Vogue.

Programming

Exhibitions 
One exhibition of American art is presented each year in partnership with international institutions. Exhibitions focus on a single artist or theme and represent a range of artistic styles and movements.

Past exhibitions 
 Quilt Art: Patchwork Art 
February 13 – May 19, 2013
 Mary Cassatt in Paris: Prints and Drawings from the Ambroise Vollard Collection
September 26, 2012 – January 20, 2013
 The Wyeths: Three Generations of American Art (Bank of America Merrill Lynch Collection)
November 10, 2011 – February 12, 2012
 Little Black Dress
July 3 – September 22, 2013
 Yousuf Karsh: Icons of the 20th Century
October 16, 2013 – January 26, 2014
 Wasteland : New Art from Los Angeles

March, 12 – July 17, 2016

 Landscape with a Ruin. Evan Roth

October 2017- November 2017

Publics programs 
The American Center for Art and Culture invites the public to discover American culture through a program of concerts, performances and discussions .
The center is also often rented out for private events at night.

Education 
The program Look & Learn aim to broaden French students’ appreciation of American culture and art and while creating a friendly environment where students feel comfortable expressing themselves in English.

Images

Exhibition samples

References

External links

Further reading 
Birchfield, James. Kentucky Countess: Mona Bismarck in Art and Fashion. Lexington: University of Kentucky Art Museum, 1997.
Launet, Edouard. "L’American Center Ressuscite à Paris." Libération. N.p., 20 Sept. 2012. Web. 24 Apr. 2013. 
"Quilt Art @ The Mona Bismarck American Center." Quilt Art @ The Mona Bismarck American Center. Needleprint, 16 Feb. 2013.
Art Slant Paris, Mona Bismarck Center

Art museums and galleries in Paris
Buildings and structures in the 16th arrondissement of Paris